The Diocese of Masan is a Latin Church ecclesiastical territory or diocese of the Catholic Church in South Korea. It is a suffragan diocese in the ecclesiastical province of the Archdiocese of Daegu.  The current bishop is Constantine Bae Ki Hyen, appointed in 2016.

History
On February 15, 1966 Pope Paul VI established the Diocese of Masan with territory taken from the Diocese of Busan.

Leadership

Ordinaries
 Stephen Kim Sou-hwan (1966–1968), appointed Archbishop of Seoul
 Joseph Byeong Hwa Chang (1968–1988) 
 Michael Pak Jeong-il (1988–2002) 
 Francis Xavier Ahn Myong-ok (2002–2016) 
 Constantine Bae Ki-hyen (2016–2022)

Coadjutor Bishops
 Francis Xavier Ahn Myong-ok (2000–2002)

See also
Roman Catholicism in South Korea

References

External links
 Diocese of Masan official site

Masan
South Gyeongsang Province
Christian organizations established in 1966
Masan
Changwon
Roman Catholic Ecclesiastical Province of Daegu